Clara McMillan (née Gooding; August 17, 1894 – November 8, 1976) was a U.S. Representative from South Carolina, and wife of Thomas S. McMillan.

Biography
Born in Brunson, South Carolina, Mcmillan attended the public schools, Confederate Home College, Charleston, South Carolina, and Flora MacDonald College, Red Springs, North Carolina.

Mcmillan was elected as a Democrat to the Seventy-sixth Congress by special election, on November 7, 1939, to fill the vacancy caused by the death of her husband, Thomas S. McMillan, and served from November 7, 1939, to January 3, 1941. She was not a candidate for reelection in 1940 to the Seventy-seventh Congress. She served in National Youth Administration, then the Office of Government Reports, Office of War Information, 1941. She was appointed information liaison officer for the Department of State, Washington, D.C., on January 1, 1946, and served until July 31, 1957.

McMillan resided in Barnwell, South Carolina, until her death on November 8, 1976. She was interred in Magnolia Cemetery, Charleston, South Carolina.

See also
Women in the United States House of Representatives

Sources

References

1894 births
1976 deaths
People from Hampton County, South Carolina
Female members of the United States House of Representatives
Women in South Carolina politics
Democratic Party members of the United States House of Representatives from South Carolina
20th-century American politicians
20th-century American women politicians
People from Barnwell, South Carolina
People of the United States Office of War Information
American women civilians in World War II